The 2019–20 season was Ludogorets Razgrad's ninth consecutive season in the Bulgarian First League, of which they were defending champions. Ludogorets Razgrad finished the season as Champions for the ninth season in a row, whilst they reached the Quarterfinals of the Bulgarian Cup, before defeat to Levski Sofia, and won the Supercup. In Europe, they were knocked out of the Champions League by Ferencváros in the First qualifying round, dropping into the Europa League where they reached the Round of 32 before being knocked out by Inter Milan.

Season events
On 25 August, Stoycho Stoev left his role as manager of Ludogorets Razgrad, with assistant manager Stanislav Genchev and Zdravko Zdravkov being put in temporary charge. On 16 December, Zdravko Zdravkov left the club to take up a role in China, whilst Pavel Vrba was confirmed as Ludogorets Razgrad's new manager starting on 1 January 2020.

On 28 February, Ludogorets' match against Arda Kardzhali scheduled for 1 March was moved to 18 March due to the precautionary measures around Ludogorets travel to Milan for their UEFA Europa League Round of 32 match against Inter Milan and the outbreak of COVID-19 in Italy.

On 13 March, the Bulgarian Football Union decided to suspend all fixtures until 13 April in accordance with the measures taken to combat the COVID-19 pandemic. On 3 April, the state of national emergency was extended until 13 May and on 11 April the Minister of Youth and Sports Krasen Kralev confirmed that no mass participation sports events and full training sessions will be held until that date.

On 30 June, Wanderson signed a new contract with the club.

Squad

Out on loan

Transfers

In

Out

Loans out

Released

Friendlies

Competitions

Bulgarian Supercup

A Football Group

Regular stage

Table

Results summary

Results by round

Results

Championship stage

Table

Results summary

Results by round

Results

Bulgarian Cup

UEFA Champions League

Qualifying rounds

UEFA Europa League

Qualifying rounds

Group stage

Knockout phase

Squad Statistics

Appearances and goals

|-
|colspan="16"|Players away from the club on loan:
|-
|colspan="16"|Players who appeared for Ludogorets Razgrad that left during the season:

|}

Goal scorers

Clean sheets

Disciplinary Record

References

Ludogorets Razgrad
PFC Ludogorets Razgrad seasons
Ludogorets Razgrad
Bulgarian football championship-winning seasons